Mont Chateau State Park was formerly a state park located beside Cheat Lake in Monongalia County, West Virginia, USA.

History

Commissioning and operations
Some  of land for park were originally purchased in June 1955. A new lodge was subsequently constructed and opened, along with the beach, on June 7, 1958. After unsuccessfully attempting different ways of managing and operating the park, it was closed in 1977.

Current status
While the park itself was closed, the state has retained a  portion of the site.  The former lodge has housed the West Virginia Geological and Economic Survey, including a small geology museum, since the 1970s.  The land also provides access from the Coopers Rock State Forest trail system to Cheat Lake.  The other  were first leased and then sold to Fred St. Clair in 1985 for recreational use.

See also
Coopers Rock State Forest
List of West Virginia state parks
Cheat Lake

References

External links
West Virginia Geological and Economic Survey

Protected areas of Monongalia County, West Virginia
1977 disestablishments in West Virginia
Protected areas established in 1955
1955 establishments in West Virginia
Former state parks of West Virginia
Museums in West Virginia